Sir Desmond Charles Moore  (12 May 1926 – 2 June 2020) was an Australian prelate of the Roman Catholic Church.

Born in Thebarton, South Australia, Moore was ordained to the priesthood in 1957. He was appointed bishop of Alotau-Sideia, Papua New Guinea, in 1970, serving until his retirement in 2001. He was appointed Knight Commander of the Order of the British Empire (KBE) in 1996.

On 2 June 2020, Moore died in Sydney, New South Wales, at the age of 94.

References

1926 births
2020 deaths
20th-century Roman Catholic bishops in Papua New Guinea
Australian expatriates in Papua New Guinea
Clergy from South Australia
Roman Catholic bishops of Alotau-Sideia
Australian Knights Commander of the Order of the British Empire